The Absent-Minded Professor is a 1961 American science fiction comedy film directed by Robert Stevenson and produced by Walt Disney Productions. It is based on the 1943 short story "A Situation of Gravity" by Samuel W. Taylor. The title character was based in part on Hubert Alyea, a professor emeritus of chemistry at Princeton University, who was known as "Dr. Boom" for his explosive demonstrations. The film stars Fred MacMurray as Professor Ned Brainard, alongside Nancy Olson, Keenan Wynn, Tommy Kirk, Leon Ames, Elliott Reid, and Edward Andrews. The plot follows Brainard as he invents a substance that defies gravity, which he later exploits through various means.

Released on March 16, 1961, the film was a huge success at the box office, and two years later became the first Disney film to have a sequel, Son of Flubber (1963). It was one of the first Disney films to be colorized (for the 1986 VHS release), and, along with The Shaggy Dog (1959) and Son of Flubber, is one of Disney's few black-and-white films to be produced after 1941. A remake titled Flubber with Robin Williams was released in 1997.

Plot
Professor Ned Brainard is an absent-minded professor of physical chemistry at Medfield College who invents a substance that gains energy when it strikes a hard surface. This discovery follows some blackboard scribbling in which he reverses a sign in the equation for enthalpy to energy plus pressure times volume. Professor Brainard names his discovery Flubber, a portmanteau of "flying rubber". In the excitement of his discovery, he misses his own wedding to Betsy Carlisle, not for the first time, but his third. Subplots include another professor wooing the disappointed Miss Carlisle, Biff Hawk's ineligibility for basketball due to failing Professor Brainard's class, Biff's father Alonzo P. Hawk's schemes to gain wealth by means of Flubber, the school's financial difficulties and debt to Mr. Hawk, and Professor Brainard's attempts to interest the government and military in uses for Flubber. Shelby Ashton, the other professor who is interested in Betsy, is given his revenge by Professor Brainard, who keeps on jumping on the top of Shelby's car, until it crashes into a police car, where Shelby is given a field sobriety test.

Looking for backers, Professor Brainard bounces his Flubber ball for an audience, but his investment pitch proves so long-winded that most of the crowd has left before they notice that the ball bounced higher on its second bounce than on its first. For a more successful demonstration, he makes his Model T fly by bombarding Flubber with radioactive particles. He puts Flubber on the soles of basketball players' shoes in a crucial game, giving them tremendous jumping ability; he also uses the substance on his own shoe soles to augment his skills during a school dance. Scheming businessman Alonzo P. Hawk becomes aware of Professor Brainard's flying car and, at Biff's suggestion, switches it for a fake. Professor Brainard's debut turns into a mockery when he finds himself with a fake Model T powered by squirrels and pigeons. Realizing it was Hawk's doing, Professor Brainard plays on Hawk's greed by pointing out that, in the 1960s, only 8% of the world's population uses cars, but nearly everyone wears shoes. Professor Brainard gives Hawk a pair of Flubber shoes; soon, Hawk cannot stop bouncing, and is blackmailed into revealing where he hid the Professor's car. A bouncing Hawk soon attracts everyone's attention, even a news crew, who interviews a physicist who sees Hawk keeps bouncing higher with each jump and remarks "by 7 tonight, he's going to be in serious trouble!". The police escort the Medfield football team to tackle Hawk on his way down, stopping his bounces. Hawk and Biff then chase after the Professor, who by now has recovered his car from Hawk's warehouse. Hawk crashes into the same squad car Shelby did, and gets arrested for illegal firearms possession. Professor Brainard convinces Betsy to accompany him to Washington, D.C. Never seeing a flying car before, the military considers it an attack and is ready to open fire until one junior officer recommends against it, as Professor Brainard is atop the United States Capitol building. Now able to convince the government of the merits of Flubber, Professor Brainard finally marries Betsy.

Cast

Production notes 
The aforementioned Prof. Alyea (1903–1996), professor of chemistry at Princeton University, earned the nickname "Dr. Boom" from Russian observers of his demonstrations at the International Science Pavilion of the Brussels World's Fair in the 1950s, which had Walt Disney in attendance. Disney told Alyea that he had given him an idea for a movie, and invited Alyea to California to give a demonstration for actor Fred MacMurray, who later mimicked Alyea's mannerisms for the film. MacMurray would later state that he had never understood chemistry until his meeting with Alyea.

The special effects were created by Robert A. Mattey and Eustace Lycett, who were nominated for an Academy Award, and included the sodium screen matte process, as well as miniatures and wire-supported mockups. The film's "Medfield Fight Song" was written by Richard M. and Robert B. Sherman, their first song for a Disney feature.

Keenan Wynn and his father Ed Wynn appear together in this film. Keenan also played Alonzo Hawk in Son of Flubber (1963) and for a third time in Herbie Rides Again (1974). Keenan's son Ned also appears uncredited in a bit part. Ed Wynn also appeared in Son of Flubber. At this stage of his life, Ed Wynn's memory was fading and he couldn't remember his lines, but he retained his innate wit and invention, so he improvised much of his dialogue, while director Stephenson instructed his crew to "just let him go on and on. You see, he had the most wonderful imagination".

Medfield College of Technology was used again as the setting for the sequel, Son of Flubber, as well as a later trilogy of films based around the character Dexter Riley — The Computer Wore Tennis Shoes (1969), Now You See Him, Now You Don't (1972), and The Strongest Man in the World (1975), each starring Kurt Russell and Cesar Romero.

Awards
At the 34th Academy Awards on April 9, 1962, The Absent-Minded Professor had nominations for three Academy Awards.
 Art Direction (Black and White) (Carroll Clark, Emile Kuri, Hal Gausman).
 Cinematography (Black and White) (Edward Colman)
 Special Effects (Robert A. Mattey, Eustace Lycett)

Releases
The film was reissued to theaters in 1967 and 1975, and released to video in 1981, 1986, and 1993. It was released as a pan and scan print on VHS in black and white in 1981 and 1993, and in a colorized version in 1986 and 1997 (to commemorate the release of the new remake Flubber). In 2003, the film finally got a widescreen treatment: The Walt Disney laserdisc #028AS is letterboxed to produce a 1.85:1 aspect ratio format. In 2008 the film was released in the United States as part of a two-disc set with its sequel, Son of Flubber.

Reception
Bosley Crowther of The New York Times called it "remarkably bouncy entertainment ... the grown-ups should find it entertaining for the silly shenanigans it contains and for the simple satisfaction of noting the pleasure it gives the kids". Variety described it as "a comedy-fantasy of infectious absurdity" with MacMurray "ideally cast". Philip K. Scheuer of the Los Angeles Times wrote that the film, "for all that it happens to be a one-joke picture, is good and funny ... while its satire should be at least as sharp as its slapstick, but isn't, the novelty of the gimmick will carry the picture to popularity". Edith Oliver of The New Yorker called it "a funny and unpretentious piece of slapstick that cannot fail to please children and all the rest of us who are fans of the Keystone Cops". The Monthly Film Bulletin called it "agreeable and entertaining", but "the comedy doesn't bounce enough. It is really a one-joke story, and could have done with more invention, more unpredictability; the humorous possibilities of the admirable flubber are not explored sufficiently".

Despite the number of positive reviews, some critics disparaged the film on its release, causing considerable pain to Walt Disney, who couldn't understand why anyone would dislike such a light-hearted picture, leading composer Richard Sherman to comment: "Don't let anybody ever tell you Walt was immune to a bad review. It bothered him! The good reviews never went to his head, but the bad reviews went to his heart".

In an interview, Taxi Driver writer Paul Schrader commented this was the first film he had ever seen. In his own words, he was "very unimpressed" by it.

The film holds a rating of 83% on Rotten Tomatoes based on 23 reviews, with an average rating of 7.3 out of 10.

Comic book adaptation
 Dell Four Color #1199 (April 1961)

Legacy

Sequels
MacMurray, Olson, Reid, and Kirk reprised their roles in Son of Flubber, a sequel released less than two years later in 1963. Hewitt also returns (now as District Attorney), as well as the two Wynns (Keenan reprising his Alonzo P. Hawk role).

In 1988, the Disney Channel produced a film with the same name, which was not a remake in as much a spiritual sequel. The movie takes place again at Medfield College, where Professor Brainard is now deceased and his work has been lost to the ages. Brainard's successor as the chemistry teacher is Professor Henry Crawford, played by Harry Anderson and his girlfriend is Ellen Whitney, played by Mary Page Keller, who is the English teacher. Professor Crawford has much of the same absent-minded attitude as Brainard, although he invented a computer program named "Albert", an avatar of Albert Einstein, to help him stay on top of his responsibilities and remember appointments. Through happenstance, Crawford rediscovers the formula for flubber. Albert warns that flubber will react to dihydrogen monoxide, then accesses Brainard's files and recommends Henry recreate the famous flying Model T. One scene that was a tribute to the original film was Henry's use of the flying car to fly atop the car of a rival suitor for Ellen, then bumping his roof. In 1989, another sequel was made where Henry has now married Ellen, and was offered a job by his college friend Ed Begley Jr., at a defense firm. Henry realizes a sinister purpose and must work with his friend to thwart it. It is also shown that Henry did further experiments on flubber: should it be baked in a kiln for 24 hours, it would solidify and become impervious to liquids, and christens this upgrade "flass" (flying glass).

Remake
The Absent-Minded Professor has been remade as a 1997 theatrical film titled Flubber, with Robin Williams as the renamed Prof. Philip Brainard, with Marcia Gay Harden as his love interest, Dr. Sara Jean Reynolds (Nancy Olson appears in a cameo). Neither the Anderson films nor the 1997 remake were as highly regarded as the original, but the Robin Williams version was still a considerable success. Both remakes were made in color.

Chemistry
Several rubbery chemical compounds are named Flubber in honor of The Absent-Minded Professors substance.

See also
 Super Ball, the bouncy toy-ball invented in 1964 that is made from a synthetic rubber

References

 Wingrove, David. The Science Fiction Film Source Book (Longman Group Limited, 1985)
 UltimateDisney.com DVD Review
 TVGuide.com Movies page

External links

 
 
 
 
 
 Review at Variety

 
1961 films
1960s science fiction comedy films
American science fiction comedy films
1960s English-language films
American black-and-white films
Flying cars in fiction
Walt Disney Studios (division) franchises
Walt Disney Pictures films
Films based on short fiction
Films directed by Robert Stevenson
Films produced by Bill Walsh (producer)
Films shot in California
Medfield College films
Films about educators
Films adapted into comics
Films scored by George Bruns
1961 comedy films
1960s American films